Associazione Sportiva Dilettantistica Cassino Calcio 1924 is an Italian association football club from Cassino, Lazio. It currently plays in Serie D.

The club was re-founded in 2010 as A.S.D. Nuova Cassino Calcio 1924 after S.S. Cassino 1927 S.r.l. went bankrupted. The club renamed to the current denomination in 2014.

The club had briefly played in Serie C2 (Lega Pro Seconda Divisione), the Italian fourth division of the professional league. The league was abolished in 2014. Serie D, the current level which Cassino is participating, since 2014 is the fourth highest level of Italian football leagues, but as the top division of non-professional (amateur) football.

History

Foundation 
The club was founded in 1924 and has played and won Serie D Group G in 2005–06 Serie D season; therefore, Cassino would play 2006–07 season in Serie C2 until 2009–10 Lega Pro Seconda Divisione.

The club also renamed from S.S. Cassino 1927 to S.S. Cassino 1927 S.r.l. in 2006–07 season.

In July 2010, due to the club did not fulfil the financial requirement, the club was expelled from the professional league.

Refoundation 
A phoenix club was formed to represent the town as A.S.D. Nuova Cassino Calcio 1924 in 2010. The club was admitted to Promozione Lazio thanks to the article 52 of N.O.I.F.

In 2013–14 season the team finally secured promotion to Eccellenza Lazio, the top level of Lazio regional football league.

In mid-2014 the club redefined its name, simply by removing the prefix "New". The club also merged with A.C. Montecassino, a minor team of the city at the same time. The club was granted a new registration number 940,720.

Players

Former players

Honours
 Coppa Italia Dilettanti
 Winners: 1985–86

References

External links 
 
 Old official website of A.S.D. Cassino Calcio 1924 
 Old official website of S.S. Cassino 
 S.S. Cassino @ Serie-D.com

Football clubs in Italy
Football clubs in Lazio
Cassino Calcio
Serie C clubs
Association football clubs established in 1924
1924 establishments in Italy
Association football clubs established in 2010
2010 establishments in Italy
Phoenix clubs (association football)